Otho Poole House is a Spanish Revival house constructed in 1928 in northwest Portland, Oregon. It was added to the National Register of Historic Places on 28 February 1991.

See also
 National Register of Historic Places listings in Northwest Portland, Oregon

References

Houses on the National Register of Historic Places in Portland, Oregon
Houses completed in 1928
Spanish Revival architecture in Oregon
1928 establishments in Oregon
Carl L. Linde buildings
Hillside, Portland, Oregon